The Walt Whitman Award is a poetry award administered by the Academy of American Poets. Named after poet Walt Whitman, the award is based on a competition of book-length poetry manuscripts by American poets who have not yet published a book. It has been described as "a transformative honor that includes publication and distribution of the book though the Academy, $5,000 in cash and an all-expenses-paid six-week residency at the Civitella Ranieri Center in the Umbrian region of Italy. The Library of Congress includes the Award among distinctions noted for poets, as does The New York Times, which also occasionally publishes articles about new awards.

The award was established in 1975. In a New York Times opinion piece from 1985, the novelist John Barth noted that 1475 manuscripts had been entered into one of the Whitman Award competitions, which exceeded the number of subscribers to some poetry journals. Since 1992, Louisiana State University Press has published each volume as part of its "Walt Whitman Award Series"; the Academy purchases and distributes copies to its associate members, along with copies of the winning volume for the James Laughlin Award. Since the academy buys 6,000 copies for its members, and the average print run for a poet's first book is 3,000 copies, a Whitman Award guarantees a best seller in the tiny poetry market.

Recipients

References

American poetry awards
Awards established in 1975
1975 establishments in the United States